Matthew Hayden is a former Australian international cricketer. An opening batsman, Hayden scored 8,625 runs in Tests and 6,133 runs in One Day Internationals (ODIs), accruing a total of 40 centuries30 in Tests and 10 in ODIs. He was described by Yahoo! Cricket as "a strong-built left-hander, an intimidating personality and [possessing] an aggressive attitude", "[with] all the ingredients" needed for success. He was named as one of Indian Cricket's "Cricketers of the Year" in 2001 and as Wisden's Cricketers of the Year in 2003. Hayden was chosen as the "ICC ODI Cricketer of the Year" in 2007.

Hayden made his Test debut against South Africa in March 1994. His first century came three years later at the Adelaide Oval when he scored 125 against the West Indies. It took another four years to score his second international century. He scored centuries against all the Test cricket playing nations, except Bangladesh. His highest score of 380which was a record score at the timecame against Zimbabwe at the WACA Ground, Perth in October 2003. He broke Brian Lara's nine-year-old record (375 runs); however, Lara reclaimed his record six months later when he scored 400 not out against England. Hayden scored centuries in each innings of a Test match on two different occasions.

Hayden made his ODI debut in 1993 and scored his first century in 2001 when he made 100 against India at the Indira Priyadarshini Stadium, Visakhapatnam. He made ten centuries against five different opponents and was most successful against New Zealand (four centuries) and India (three centuries). Hayden's highest score of 181 not out was made against New Zealand in 2007; the score was an Australian record at the time. His 66-ball century against South Africa during the 2007 World Cup was the fastest by an Australian in ODIs at the time. Hayden was the leading run-scorer in the tournament (658 runs) and scored three centuries.

Hayden played nine Twenty20 International (T20I) matches between 2005 and 2007; his highest score in the format is 73 not out. , he ranks fourteenth in the list of century-makers in international cricket.

Key

 *  Remained not out
   Man of the match

Test centuries

One Day International centuries

Notes

References

External links
Matthew Hayden at Howstat

Hayden, Matthew
Hayden,centuries